Squash TV is the official live and video-on-demand website of online service exclusively for squash developed by the Professional Squash Association, the most important governing body for the men's and women's professional squash circuit.

The website was launched in 2009 by the PSA during the last World Series event of this year, the Saudi International 2009. The website covers all the best tournament in the world, including the PSA World Series and several of the prestigious PSA International tournaments.

The iconic commentator of this channel is Joey Barrington supplemented by the former world number 4, Paul Johnson both of England, and in a few tournaments by Simon Parke, Chris Gordon, Lee Drew or Johnny Williams.

See also
Professional Squash Association
PSA World Series
World Squash Federation

References

External links
Official SquashTV Website

Squash websites
British sport websites